The Open Polytechnic of New Zealand or Open Polytechnic (Māori: Kuratini Tuwhera) is a government-owned tertiary education institution operating as the specialist national provider of open and distance learning (ODL). On 1 April 2020, The Open Polytechnic became a subsidiary of New Zealand Institute of Skills & Technology alongside the 15 other Institutes of Technology and Polytechnics (ITPs).

History

The Polytechnic began life as the Technical Correspondence School in 1946, providing resettlement training for returned servicemen and women following World War II. In 1963 it became the Technical Correspondence Institute offering mainly theory training in trades subjects.

The institution underwent a major transformation in 1990 when it was renamed The Open Polytechnic of New Zealand, going on to become a multi-faceted provider of ODL courses and services.

Located in Lower Hutt near New Zealand's capital city Wellington, The Open Polytechnic provides tertiary education at a national level for 30,000 students each year.

References

External links

Facebook page
YouTube channel
Twitter channel

Te Pūkenga – New Zealand Institute of Skills and Technology
Lower Hutt
Distance education institutions based in New Zealand
Educational institutions established in 1946
2020 disestablishments in New Zealand
1946 establishments in New Zealand